Kongdej Jaturanrasamee (born 1972) is a Thai screenwriter, film director and former musician. His screenplays include The Letter, Tom-Yum-Goong, Noo Hin: The Movie and Me ... Myself. His own films include Sayew and Midnight My Love.

Biography

Education, early career
Kongdej graduated from the film department at King Mongkut's Institute of Technology Ladkrabang. He began his career in the late 1990s directing music videos for record label RS Promotion. He also wrote screenplays for the company's the then-new RS Film, but none were ever produced into films.

In addition, he also a member of Si Tao Thoe, an alternative rock band that was popular in the mid-90s of the Thai music industry.

Sayew, The Letter
Kongdej made his directorial debut with Sayew, which he co-wrote and co-directed with Kiat Songsanant. A comedy about a tomboyish young woman exploring sex and her sexuality, it won an honorable mention Asian Trade Winds Award at the 2003 Seattle International Film Festival.

He had also been approached by producer Duangkamol Limcharoen to write the screenplay for the romantic drama, The Letter, a 2004 Thai remake of a 1997 Korean film. The film was a hit, and with the screenplay, Kongdej became a sought-after scriptwriter. He also wrote the screenplay for the 2005 Tony Jaa martial arts film, Tom-Yum-Goong.

Midnight My Love
His first solo directorial effort, 2005's Midnight My Love, was nominated for several Thailand National Film Association Awards, including best director and best screenplay. It won best director and best script awards from the Bangkok Critics Assembly. The romantic comedy-drama starred comedian Petchtai Wongkamlao in a dramatic role as a melancholy taxi driver who develops a relationship with a massage parlor worker (Woranut Wongsawan). Midnight My Love was featured at several film festivals, including the Deauville Asian Film Festival, Cinefan and the Chicago International Film Festival.

He also wrote the screenplay for the 2006 comic-book adaptation Noo Hin: The Movie and the 2007 romantic comedy Me ... Myself.

His 2008 romantic comedy is Kod (กอด), about "a three-armed man and a big-bosomed girl."

Other projects include the screenplay for Nonzee Nimibutr's 2008 fantasy, Queen of Langkasuka.

Filmography

References

External links
 
 

1972 births
Living people
Kongdej Jaturanrasamee
Kongdej Jaturanrasamee
Kongdej Jaturanrasamee